Renato Piccolotto is an internationally renowned Italian chef who was born in Asolo (Province of Treviso) in 1954 and is the Executive Chef of the Hotel Cipriani in Venice where he started working in 1983.

In the recent years he has been the head chef for the events of Elton John for the "Elton John AIDS Foundation" that is set during the Academy Award ceremony.

External links
 Hotel Cipriani Chef's Profile
 http://www.gourmandia.com/chefs/renato-piccolotto
 http://www.entrechefs.co.uk/chef.asp?id=15&Renato-Piccolotto
 http://www.style.it/cont/lifestyle/style-files/0804/2800/Chef-in-crociera-Piccolotto-6.asp

1954 births
Living people
People from Asolo
Italian chefs